Dax Reynosa, often mononymously known as Dax and by the former stage name Theory, is an American underground hip hop artist, producer, songwriter, smooth jazz singer, and music manager from Whittier, California. As a hip hop artist, he co-founded the underground Christian hip hop collective Tunnel Rats and the affiliated groups LPG, Footsoldiers, and The Resistance. He also co-founded the Latin funk and R&B band Elé and formed The Dax Band. He has contributed vocals and songwriting to numerous jazz recordings.

Biography 
In 1983, influenced by the newly emerged hip hop culture at Radiotron in MacArthur Park, Reynosa started b-boying and battle rapping. His lyrics discussed both his Christian faith and the crack epidemic he grew up amidst. He cites his formative influences as David Guzman and Soldiers for Christ. He also formed a dance crew, Cousins Three, with his cousins V.Night and Jurny Big, and they would compete at both dance and rapping at Pico Rivera Park. Reynosa in 2012 recounted the fiercely competitive nature of the rap battles he engaged in: "When you lose, you change your name cuz I’m gonna iron your name on the back of my sweater. We battle for rhyme books and you can never rap those rhymes again. I would burn it in front of you."

In 1993, he formed the collective Tunnel Rats, taking inspiration for its name from his father, who served as a tunnel rat in the Vietnam war. Mostly finding audiences at churches, the group struggled to find acceptance from many Christians due to their lyrical braggadocio. The group also encountered racial prejudice when touring in the Southern United States because the majority of the group was of Mexican descent. Shortly after the formation of Tunnel Rats, Reynosa and Jurny Big, as LPG, released The Earthworm in 1995, a breakthrough album in Christian hip hop. The next year, Tunnel Rats released its first album, Experience. LPG released a second album, 360 Degrees, in 1998, and Tunnel Rats released the groundbreaking Tunnel Vision through Uprok Records in 2001. LPG dropped The Gadfly in 2003, and Tunnel Rats led the Uprok compilation Underground Rise, Volume 1: Sunrise/Sunset. Tunnel Rats released its self-titled album in 2004. In 2006, Reynosa helped organize the Tunnel Rats-affiliated group Footsoldiers, and formed the production duo The Resistance with Tunnel Rats producer Dert. Footsoldiers and the Resistance collaborated with KRS-One on his album Life, and KRS-One in return appeared on the Footsoldiers' album Live This. Reynosa co-produced the 2003 documentary film, The Battle for L.A.: Footsoldiers, Vol. 1, with director Darren Doane. Tunnel Rats currently is on hiatus, and Reynosa currently contributes vocals to jazz recordings. In 2013, he co-founded Elé with Adelaide "Addie" Benavides, and works as the band's manager. Elé mixes together R&B, pop, funk and blues with Latin genres such as cumbia, merengue, and salsa. He also formed a self-described jazz band, The Dax Band.

Discography

Tunnel Rats

LPG

As featured artist

Production discography

The Resistance production discography

Additional credits

Filmography

References

American hip hop record producers
Rappers from California
American male rappers
American rappers of Mexican descent
Smooth jazz singers
Tunnel Rats (music group) members
Hispanic and Latino American singers
Christian hip hop
Songwriters from California
20th-century births
Hip hop musicians from Whittier, California
Jazz musicians from California
American music managers
Underground rappers
Film producers from California
Living people
Year of birth missing (living people)